West Cross is the name of an electoral ward in the Mumbles community and a suburb in the City and County of Swansea, Wales, UK.  The ward falls within the Mumbles community.

The electoral ward consists of some or all of the following areas: Manselfield, Norton, West Cross, Mumbles and Newton, in the parliamentary constituency of Gower.  It is bordered by the wards of Mayals to the north; Swansea Bay to the east; Oystermouth and Newton to the south; and Bishopston to the west.

2008 Swansea Council election
The turnout for the 2008 local council elections for West Cross was 47.19%.  The results were:

External links
West Cross ward info

Swansea electoral wards
Mumbles